Shishtavec is a village in Kukës County in northeastern Albania. It was also the seat of the former municipality of the same name. At the 2015 local government reform it became part of the municipality Kukës. The administrative unit of Shishtavec contains the villages Borje, Oreshkë, Cërnalevë and Shishtavec which are populated by the Muslim Slavic speaking Gorani people, whereas the villages of Novosej, Kollovoz and Shtrezë are inhabited by Albanians.

According to the 2011 census, 68.3% of the municipality identified ethnically as Albanian, while 7.7% identified as Macedonian. The remainder did not declare an ethnicity.

The Gorani population in Albania identifies itself mostly as ethnically Albanian, unlike the Gorani population of neighbouring countries. The local Gorani representatives have sought the recognition as a distinct minority group, as is the case in Bulgaria, Serbia, Kosovo and North Macedonia.

Village of Shishtavec 

The village of Shishtavec consists of around 300 households with over 1,800 Gorani inhabitants. The area is part of the wider Gora region, most of it lies on the other side of the border in Kosovo.

Roughly  of potatoes are planted annually in Shishtavec.

References

Albania–Kosovo border crossings
Populated places in Kukës
Villages in Kukës County
Macedonian communities in Albania